Assiniboia may refer one of a number of different locations and administrative jurisdictions in Canada. The name is taken from the Assiniboine First Nation, and the Assiniboine River, named for the people.

 Assiniboia refers to either of two historical districts in Canada's North-West Territories.
 Assiniboia, Saskatchewan is a town in south-central Saskatchewan.
 Assiniboia (electoral district) was a Canadian federal electoral district in Saskatchewan that was represented in the Canadian House of Commons from 1908 to 1988.
 Assiniboia (provincial electoral district) is the name of a current provincial electoral district in the Canadian province of Manitoba.
 Assiniboia Regional Park, a park in Saskatchewan.
 Assiniboia is also a city ward in Winnipeg, Manitoba with subdivisions known as Crestview, Westwood, and St. Charles.

There are also:
 Assiniboia East, a former Canadian federal electoral district
 Assiniboia West, a former Canadian federal electoral district
 the Council of Assiniboia, the appointed administrative body for Rupert's Land which existed from 1821 to 1870
 the Legislative Assembly of Assiniboia, a legislature set up for a provisional government established by Louis Riel from 1869 to 1870